Nick Miele (born December 22, 1992) is an American soccer player who played as a defender.

Career

College and amateur
Miele spent his entire college career at the University of New Mexico.  He made a total of 55 appearances for the Lobos and tallied one goal and one assist.

He also played in the Premier Development League for Albuquerque Sol FC.

Professional
On March 18, 2015, Miele signed a professional contract with USL club Seattle Sounders FC 2.  He made his professional debut on March 29 against Whitecaps FC 2.

References

External links
New Mexico Lobos bio

1992 births
Living people
American soccer players
New Mexico Lobos men's soccer players
Albuquerque Sol FC players
Tacoma Defiance players
Association football defenders
Soccer players from New Mexico
USL League Two players
USL Championship players